In mathematics, mirror symmetry is a conjectural relationship between certain Calabi–Yau manifolds and a constructed "mirror manifold". The conjecture allows one to relate the number of rational curves on a Calabi-Yau manifold (encoded as Gromov–Witten invariants) to integrals from a family of varieties (encoded as period integrals on a variation of Hodge structures). In short, this means there is a relation between the number of genus  algebraic curves of degree  on a Calabi-Yau variety  and integrals on a dual variety . Shortly after, Sheldon Katz wrote a summary paper outlining part of their construction and conjectures what the rigorous mathematical interpretation could be.

Constructing the mirror of a quintic threefold 
Originally, the construction of mirror manifolds was discovered through an ad-hoc procedure. Essentially, to a generic quintic threefold  there should be associated a one-parameter family of Calabi-Yau manifolds  which has multiple singularities. After blowing up these singularities, they are resolved and a new Calabi-Yau manifold  was constructed. which had a flipped Hodge diamond. In particular, there are isomorphisms

but most importantly, there is an isomorphism

Here we outline the original construction of mirror manifolds, and consider the string-theoretic background and conjecture with the mirror manifolds in a later section of this article.

Complex moduli 
This polynomial is equivalently described as a global section of the line bundle . Notice the vector space of global sections has dimension but there are two equivalences of these polynomials. First, polynomials under scaling by the algebraic torus  (non-zero scalers of the base field) given equivalent spaces. This gives a  dimensional parameter space since , which can be constructed using Geometric invariant theory. This is because

Using the Hodge structure we can find the dimensions of each of the components. First, because  is Calabi-Yau,  so giving the Hodge numbers , hence  giving the dimension of the moduli space of Calabi-Yau manifolds. Because of the Bogomolev-Tian-Todorov theorem, all such deformations are unobstructed, so the smooth space  is in fact the moduli space of quintic threefolds. The whole point of this construction is to show how the complex parameters in this moduli space are converted into Kähler parameters of the mirror manifold.

Mirror manifold 
There is a distinguished family of Calabi-Yau manifolds  called the Dwork family. It is the projective family

over the complex plane . Now, notice there is only a single dimension of complex deformations of this family, coming from  having varying values.

Ideas from string theory 

These curves  are called world-sheets and represent the birth and death of a particle as a closed string. Since a string could split over time into two strings, or more, and eventually these strings will come together and collapse at the end of the lifetime of the particle, an algebraic curve mathematically represents this string lifetime. For simplicity, only genus 0 curves were considered originally, and many of the results popularized in mathematics focused only on this case.

Also, in physics terminology, these theories are  heterotic string theories because they have  supersymmetry that comes in a pair, so really there are four supersymmetries. This is important because it implies there is a pair of operators  acting on the Hilbert space of states, but only defined up to a sign. This ambiguity is what originally suggested to physicists there should exist a pair of Calabi-Yau manifolds which have dual string theories, one's that exchange this ambiguity between one another.

The space  has a complex structure, which is an integrable almost-complex structure , and because it is a Kähler manifold it necessarily has a symplectic structure  called the Kähler form which can be complexified to a complexified Kähler form  which is a closed -form, hence its cohomology class is in  The main idea behind the Mirror Symmetry conjectures is to study the deformations, or moduli, of the complex structure  and the complexified symplectic structure  in a way that makes these two dual to each other. In particular, from a physics perspective, the super conformal field theory of a Calabi-Yau manifold  should be equivalent to the dual super conformal field theory of the mirror manifold . Here conformal means conformal equivalence which is the same as and equivalence class of complex structures on the curve .

A-model

Correlation functions from String theory 
Given a Calabi-Yau manifold  with complexified Kähler class  the nonlinear sigma model of the string theory should contain the three generations of particles, plus the electromagnetic, weak, and strong forces. Note this space is the eigenspace of an operator  on the Hilbert space of states for the string theory. This three point function is "computed" as

Defining these instanton numbers  is the subject matter of Gromov–Witten theory. Note that in the definition of this correlation function, it only depends on the Kahler class. This inspired some mathematicians to study hypothetical moduli spaces of Kahler structures on a manifold.

Mathematical interpretation of A-model correlation functions 

In the A-model the corresponding moduli space are the moduli of pseudoholomorphic curves

or the Kontsevich moduli spaces

These moduli spaces can be equipped with a virtual fundamental class
 or 
which is represented as the vanishing locus of a section  of a sheaf called the Obstruction sheaf  over the moduli space. This section comes from the differential equation which can be viewed as a perturbation of the map . It can also be viewed as the Poincaré dual of the Euler class of  if it is a Vector bundle.

B-model

Correlation functions from String theory 
For the same Calabi-Yau manifold  in the A-model subsection, there is a dual superconformal field theory which has states in the eigenspace  of the operator . Its three-point correlation function is defined as

Another formulation of Gauss-Manin connection 
The action of the cohomology classes  on the  can also be understood as a cohomological variant of the interior product. Locally, the class  corresponds to a Cech cocycle  for some nice enough cover  giving a section . This is because on the overlaps   giving

hence it defines a 1-cocycle. This is because locally the Gauss-Manin connection acts as the interior product.

Mathematical interpretation of B-model correlation functions 
Mathematically, the B-model is a variation of hodge structures which was originally given by the construction from the Dwork family.

Mirror conjecture 
Relating these two models of string theory by resolving the ambiguity of sign for the operators  led physicists to the following conjecture: for a Calabi-Yau manifold  there should exist a mirror Calabi-Yau manifold  such that there exists a mirror isomorphism  giving the compatibility of the associated A-model and B-model. Moreover, these integrals are actually computable!

See also 

 Cotangent complex
 Homotopy associative algebra
 Kuranishi structure
 Mirror symmetry (string theory)
 Moduli of algebraic curves
 Kontsevich moduli space

External links 

 https://ocw.mit.edu/courses/mathematics/18-969-topics-in-geometry-mirror-symmetry-spring-2009/lecture-notes/

References

Books/Notes 
 Mirror Symmetry - Clay Mathematics Institute ebook
 Mirror Symmetry and Algebraic Geometry - Cox, Katz
 On the work of Givental relative to mirror symmetry

First proofs 
 Equivariant Gromov - Witten Invariants - Givental's original proof for projective complete intersections
 The mirror formula for quintic threefolds
 Rational curves on hypersurfaces (after A. Givental) - an explanation of Givental's proof
 Mirror Principle I - Lian, Liu, Yau's proof closing gaps in Givental's proof. His proof required the undeveloped theory of Floer homology
 Dual Polyhedra and Mirror Symmetry for Calabi-Yau Hypersurfaces in Toric Varieties - first general construction of mirror varieties for Calabi-Yau's in toric varieties
Mirror symmetry for abelian varieties

Derived geometry in Mirror symmetry 

 Notes on supersymmetric and holomorphic field theories in dimensions 2 and 4

Research 
 Mirror symmetry: from categories to curve counts - relation between homological mirror symmetry and classical mirror symmetry
 Intrinsic mirror symmetry and punctured Gromov-Witten invariants

Homological mirror symmetry 

 Categorical Mirror Symmetry: The Elliptic Curve
 An Introduction to Homological Mirror Symmetry and the Case of Elliptic Curves
 Homological mirror symmetry for the genus two curve
 Homological mirror symmetry for the quintic 3-fold
 Homological Mirror Symmetry for Calabi-Yau hypersurfaces in projective space
 Speculations on homological mirror symmetry for hypersurfaces in 

Mathematical physics
Conjectures
String theory
Algebraic geometry